La Organizacion Romantica de Mexico '91 is a studio album released in 1991 by the Mexican group Los Freddy's.

Track listing

External links
 Amazon.com

1991 albums
Los Freddy's albums